Lawrence Abu Hamdan (born 1985, in Amman) is a contemporary artist based in Beirut. His work looks into the political effects of listening, using various kinds of audio to explore its effects on human rights and law. Because of his work with sound, Abu Hamdan has testified as an expert witness in asylum hearings in the United Kingdom.

His work has been featured in major group exhibitions including the British Art Show 8 (2015–17), the Liverpool Biennial (2016), and third New Museum Triennial (2015). Solo exhibitions of the artists work have been presented at the Chisenhale Gallery (2018); The Showroom, London (2012); Kunsthalle Sankt Gallen (2015); and Portikus, Frankfurt (2016). His work is included in the collections of the Arts Council England and The Museum of Modern Art, New York. 

He jointly won, with Tai Shani, Oscar Murillo and Helen Cammock, the 2019 Turner Prize for his work based on interviews with former detainees at a Syrian prison.

Career and artwork
Born in Amman, Jordan, Abu Hamdan grew up in York in the UK. In the 2000s he played in a series of DIY bands, including Isambard Kingston Brunel, Poltergroom and Cleckhuddersfax, who released records on the London-based label Upset The Rhythm. Abu Hamdan received his PhD from the Centre for Research Architecture at Goldsmiths, University of London in 2017.

Abu Hamdan describes his work as concerned with the "politics of listening." Describing himself as a "private ear", his work confronts specific instances and examples of listening and the voice as they related to legal and political contexts. In his 2012 radio documentary The Whole Truth, he explored new technologies that were attempting to act as lie-detectors for voices. In a 2015 commission for The Armory Show in New York, he distributed bags of potato chips in foil wrappers. The work built on research undertaken by scientists at the Massachusetts Institute of Technology in which they were able to turn common objects into listening devices by capturing vibrations recorded on physical objects and transferring them back into speech. His audio investigations have been used as evidence in UK asylum and immigration courts, and in support of organisations such as Amnesty International and Child Protection International, as well as researchers in forensic architecture.

He has won awards including the 2016 Nam June Paik New Media Award, the 2020 Edvard Munch Award, and the 2019 Turner Prize, which he won jointly with Helen Cammock, Oscar Murillo and Tai Shani.  He has held solo exhibitions at Witte De With Rotterdam (2019), Tate Modern Tank & Chissenhaller, London, Hammer Museum, Los Angeles (2018), Portikus Frankfurt (2016), Kunstmuseum St. Gallen (2015), Cairo Beirut (2013), London Showroom (2012) and Utrecht Casco (2012). His work is in the collections of the Museum of Modern Art, Guggenheim, Van Abbe, Centre Pompidou and Tate Modern.

Abu Hamdan is a fellow at the University of Chicago, was a guest at the DAAD Artists Program in Berlin in 2017-18, and was a fellow at the Vera List Center for Art and Politics at the New School in New York from 2015-17.

Awards and fellowships
 Edvard Munch Award (2020)
DAAD Visual Artists Residency (2017)
 Nam June Paik Award (2016)
 Vera List Center Fellow, New School, New York (2015–17)
2019 Turner Prize

Exhibitions 

 Sfeir-Semler Gallery, Beirut (2019)

Publications

References

External links
Word Stress: Lawrence Abu Hamdan in conversation with Anthony Downey

Living people
Alumni of Goldsmiths, University of London
1985 births
Jordanian contemporary artists
People from Amman